Kasımlı can refer to:

 Kasımlı, Alaplı
 Kasımlı, Silvan